Robyn Lee (born 8 January 1999) is a Zimbabwean swimmer. She competed in the women's 100 metre backstroke event at the 2017 World Aquatics Championships. In 2019, she represented Zimbabwe at the 2019 African Games held in Rabat, Morocco and she won the bronze medal in the women's 200 metre backstroke event.

References

External links
 

1999 births
Living people
Zimbabwean female backstroke swimmers
Place of birth missing (living people)
Swimmers at the 2014 Summer Youth Olympics
Swimmers at the 2019 African Games
African Games medalists in swimming
African Games bronze medalists for Zimbabwe
20th-century Zimbabwean women
21st-century Zimbabwean women